The following is a list of individuals associated with Radcliffe College through attending as a student, or serving as college president or dean.

List of presidents
 Elizabeth Cabot Agassiz, 1894–1900 (honorary president 1900–1903)
 LeBaron Russell Briggs, 1903–1923
 Ada Louise Comstock, 1923–1943
 Wilbur Kitchener Jordan, 1943–1960
 Mary Bunting, 1960–1972
 Matina Horner, 1972–1989
 Linda Wilson, 1989–1999

Deans
 Agnes Irwin, 1894–1909

Notable alumnae

Art and architecture historians 

 Leila Cook Barber, MA degree 1928, art historian and professor emeritus at Vassar College, specializing in the Renaissance art and medieval studies.
 Mary Berenson (1864–1945), Harvard Annex student 1884-1885, art historian
 Katharine Seymour Day, historical preservationist
 Florence M. Montgomery (1914–1998), American art historian and curator at Winterthur Museum, Garden and Library
 Phoebe Stanton (1914–2003), MA 1939, architectural historian, professor at Johns Hopkins University, and urban planner for Baltimore.

Writers, poets, journalists 

 Virginia Hamilton Adair, poet
 Alice Adams, writer
 Fannie Fern Andrews, writer
 Margaret Atwood, 1961, author
 Marita Bonner, writer, playwright
 Elizabeth Brewster, poet
 Anne Fadiman, essayist and reporter
 Amy Goodman, journalist and political activist
 Joyce Ballou Gregorian, 1968, science fiction author
 Rona Jaffe, author
 Helen Keller, deaf blind writer, activist
 Maxine Kumin, poet and author
 Ursula K. Le Guin, American writer, poet
 Alison Lurie, writer
 Michel McQueen Martin, 1980, journalist
 Anne McCaffrey, 1947, science fiction author
 Priscilla Johnson McMillan, MA 1953, journalist, translator, author, historian
 Andrea Nye a feminist philosopher and writer
 Linda Pastan, poet
 Julia Quinn, New York Times best selling author
 Clara Claiborne Park (1923–2010), author who raised awareness of autism
 Francine Prose writer
 Adrienne Rich, poet
 Margot Roosevelt, journalist
 Elsie Singmaster, author
 Gertrude Stein, American writer, poet, playwright and feminist
 Jean Valentine, poet
 Lally Weymouth, journalist
 Ruth Whitman, poet
 Charlotte Wilder, MA, poet and eldest sister of Thornton Wilder

Others 
 Elizabeth Bailey, economist
 Tryphosa Bates-Batcheller, singer
 Deborah Batts, judge
 Gail Lee Bernstein, Japanese historian
 Susan Berresford, 1965, president of the Ford Foundation 1996–2007
 Marsha Berzon, judge
 Benazir Bhutto, first woman elected to lead a Muslim state, Prime Minister of Pakistan (1988–1990; 1993–1996)
 Melissa Block, radio journalist, co-host, All Things Considered
 Thérèse Bonney, photographer and publicist
 Jane Britton, 1967, murdered while a graduate student at Harvard University
 Stockard Channing, actress, famous for her roles in Grease and The West Wing
 Nancy Chodorow, sociologist
 Judy Clapp, 1952, computer scientist
 Zoe Cruz, business, co-president of Morgan Stanley (most powerful woman on Wall Street)
 Natalie Zemon Davis, historian of the early modern period
 Frances Gardiner Davenport (1870–1927), historian of he later Middle Ages and the European colonization
 Jane Dempsey Douglass, feminist theologian, ecclesiastical historian, and president of the World Alliance of Reformed Churches
 Peggy Dulany, heiress and philanthropist
 Eva Beatrice Dykes, academic
 Debbie Ellison
 Rebecca Elson
 Barbara Epstein
 Norma Farber
 Abigail Folger, 1964, American coffee heiress, debutante, socialite, volunteer social worker, civil rights devotee
 Mary Parker Follett
 Anne Garrels
 Katharine Fullerton Gerould
 Carol Gilligan
 Ellen Goodman
 Jennifer Gordon
 Susanna Grannis, academic and nonprofit organizer
 Phyllis Granoff
 Linda Greenhouse
 Marjorie Grene
 Gisela Kahn Gresser
 Lani Guinier
 Amy Gutmann, current president of the University of Pennsylvania
 Melissa Glenn Haber
 Rachel Hadas
 Virginia Hall
 Olive Hazlett
 Diana Mara Henry, photographer
 Helen Sawyer Hogg
 Elizabeth Holtzman
 Elizabeth Hubbard
 Ruth Hubbard, professor, biologist, feminist
 Josephine Hull
 Leslie P. Hume, historian and philanthropist
 Catharine Sargent Huntington, actress, producer, director, founder of multiple theater companies, activist
 Lydia P. Jackson, former Louisiana state legislator
 Nancy Johnson
 Sara Murray Jordan, gastroenterologist
 Roberta Karmel (born 1937), Centennial Professor of Law at Brooklyn Law School, and first female commissioner of the U.S. Securities and Exchange Commission
 Caroline Kennedy
 Sinah Estelle Kelley, chemist
 Jean Kwok
 Susanne Langer
 Mary Lasker, health activist and philanthropist
 Henrietta Swan Leavitt
 Judith Ledeboer, architect
 Mary Lefkowitz
 Edith Lesley
 Princess Christina, Mrs. Magnuson
 Pauline Maier
 Emily Mann (BA English literature 1974), director
 Elizabeth Holloway Marston, MA 1921—involved in the creation of the comic book character Wonder Woman
 Helen Reimensnyder Martin
 Jessica Mathews
 Laura Meneses, political activist
 Karen Nelson Moore
 Alice Vanderbilt Morris
 Amelia Muir Baldwin, interior designer and women's suffrage activist
 Chris Mulford, AB 1963, breastfeeding advocate
 Laura Nader, professor in controlling processes
 Daisy Newman
 Ursula Oppens, classical pianist
 Deborah Orin
 Mary White Ovington
 Masako Owada, 1985, empress of Japan
 Judith Palfrey:
 Cecilia Payne-Gaposchkin, astronomer
 Josephine Preston Peabody
 Katha Pollitt
 Carol Potter, actress
 Bonnie Raitt (attended one year), Grammy Award-winning singer and musician
 Philinda Rand
 Emeline Hill Richardson, archeologist
 Alice Rivlin, economist
 Helen Jean Rogers
 Judith Ann Wilson Rogers
 Michelle Rosaldo, anthropologist
 Phyllis Schlafly, political activist, coined term A choice not an echo
 Ellen Schrecker
 Mary Sears, oceanographer
 Edie Sedgwick (attended), iconic American socialite and Warhol superstar
 Carla J. Shatz, neuroscientist 
 Ellen Biddle Shipman, landscape architect (left after one year)
 Judith Shuval, sociologist
 Diane Souvaine, computer scientist
 Diane B. Snelling
 Anne Whiston Spirn, landscape architect
 Edith G. Stedman, 1910, head the Appointment Bureau 1930–1954
 Doris Zemurray Stone, 1930 (1909–1994), archaeologist and ethnographer of pre-Columbian Mesoamerican cultures
 Abby A. Sutherland, cum laude graduate, head mistress, president, and owner of The Ogontz School for Girls. Sutherland deeded the school to Penn State in 1950.
 Mary E. Switzer
 Martha J. B. Thomas, (1926–2006), PhD MBA, chemical engineer
 Caroline Thompson, screenwriter-director
 Barbara Tuchman
 Lily Tuck
 Abby Howe Turner
 Ruth Turner
 Julie Vargas
 Emily Vermeule, archeologist
 Maribel Vinson, figure skater
 Caroline F. Ware
 Ruth Wendell Washburn, educational psychologist
 Hannah Weiner
 Natalie Wexler
 Nancy Wexler, geneticist
 Marina von Neumann Whitman, economist
 Olive Winchester, professor at the Point Loma, Northwest, and Eastern Nazarene colleges
 Marie Winn

Notes

Lists of people by university or college in Massachusetts